Blackstorm are a rock/blues band from Yuendumu in the Northern Territory. The members are Warlpiri and their songs are sung in Warlpiri and English. The band was nominated for a Deadly Award for Best Band in 2001.

Music from Blackstorm and its members were used in the Bush Mechanics shows.

Both Rice and Robertson also work as artists.

Discography
 Desert Calling (1995) - CAAMA
 Highway To Nowhere (2001) - CAAMA

References

External links 
Bios at Bush Mechanics home page
Gordon Jangala Robertson
Micah Jampijinpa Hudson
Sebastian Japanangka Poulson
Donovan Jampijinpa Rice

Northern Territory musical groups
Indigenous Australian musical groups